Medieval Islamic Civilization: An Encyclopedia is an encyclopedia in the English language about culture of the Islamic world in Middle Ages. It is published by Routledge and edited by Josef W. Meri.

References

External links
http://cw.routledge.com/ref/middleages/Islamic/index.html

2005 non-fiction books
Encyclopedias of history
Routledge books
Medieval Islamic world